Samuel Barron (November 28, 1809 – February 26, 1888) was a United States, and later Confederate naval officer, acting as a representative in Europe for the Confederacy during the American Civil War.

Early life and career
Born to a prominent military family in Hampton, Virginia, Barron was entered into the US Navy at age two on January 1, 1812 (presumably because his father, Commodore Samuel Barron (1765-1810), had commanded the nearby naval base). In 1820, Barron began serving as a midshipman. He rose through the ranks and was commissioned a lieutenant on March 3, 1827. He was promoted to commander on July 15, 1847 during the Mexican–American War.

He then was captain of the steam frigate , whose crew included George Dewey, from 1858 until 1859. He was appointed chief of the Bureau of Detail in 1860, and thus held considerable influence within the US Navy. Following Lincoln's inauguration the following year, he was suspected of attempting to gain control over the Department of the Navy.

Civil War
In April 1861, after Virginia announced its secession from the Union, Barron resigned from the U.S. Navy and, although his resignation was denied by the United States (later being listed by Navy Secretary Gideon Welles on April 22 as dismissed), he accepted a commission as Captain in the Virginia Navy and, as chief of the Office of Naval Detail and Equipment, later assisting in organizing a coastal defense of the Virginia and North Carolina coastlines.

After Virginia's fleet was integrated with the Confederate Navy, Barron was issued a commission as commander and appointed chief of the Office of Orders and Details on June 10. Barron would remain in that post until July 20, when Confederate Secretary of the Navy Stephen R. Mallory agreed to Barron's request to be assigned as commander of coastal defences of Virginia and North Carolina, an important port for Pamlico Sound-based Confederate privateers. Arriving at his headquarters on Fort Hatteras on August 28, Barron commanded the defense of both the forts Hatteras and Clark against Union Flag Officer Silas H. Stringham during the Battle of Hatteras Inlet on August 28–29. Barron was captured following the surrender of the two fortresses. Held at Fort Columbus on Governors Island in New York harbor, then at Ft. Warren, Boston harbor, Barron was eventually released in a prisoner exchange the next year.

In 1862 while imprisoned at Ft. Warren, Boston, Lt. William T. Glassell stated: "Generals Buckner and Tilghman were then rooming with me, and together with Commodore Barron..."

In November 1862, Barron was briefly reassigned command of naval forces in Virginia before he was sent to Great Britain to take command of the two ironclad rams, CSS North Carolina and CSS Mississippi (also known as the 'Laird Rams'), that were being built under the direction of Commander James D. Bulloch for the Confederacy. After the ships were seized by British authorities the following year, Barron traveled to France, remaining in Paris as "Flag Officer" commanding Confederate States Naval Forces in Europe acting as a contact for Confederate naval officers as well as blockade runners and privateers until February 25, 1865 when he resigned his commission, returning to the United States shortly before the Confederacy's surrender a month later. Retiring to his home in Essex County, Virginia, Barron took up farm life until his death on February 26, 1888.

References
 McHenry, Robert. Webster's American Military Biographies. Springfield, Mass.: G & C. Merriam Co., 1978.
 Spenser, Warren F. The Confederate Navy in Europe. Tuscaloosa, Ala.: The University of Alabama Press., 1983.

External links
 Civil War Biographies - Samuel Barron
 Samuel Barron in Encyclopedia Virginia
 Letters To Capt. Samuel Barron, Gosport Navy Yard - August to October 1855
 The CSS Alabamas Duel with the USS Kearsarge Official Records

1809 births
1888 deaths
Confederate States Navy captains
United States Navy officers
People of Virginia in the American Civil War
American Civil War prisoners of war